Breakfast with a View to the Elbrus Mountains is a 1993 Russian romantic drama film directed by Nikolai Maletsky. The film adaptation of the novel of the same name by Yuri Vizbor.

Plot 
The film tells about the journalist Pavel Denisov, who broke up with his beloved woman Larisa and went to the mountains, where he met another woman who fell in love with him.

Cast 
 Igor Kostolevsky
 Vera Sotnikova
 Vera Kanshina
 Igor Shavlak
 Albert Filozov
 Mikhail Filippov
 Veniamin Smekhov
 Natalya Rychagova
 Mikhail Gamulin
 Andrei Sukhar
Yuri Sarantsev

References

External links 
 

1993 films
1993 romantic drama films
Russian romantic drama films
1990s Russian-language films
Films scored by Gennady Gladkov
Studio Ekran films
Films based on Russian novels